The Green Sky Adventures Micro Mong is an ultralight biplane based on the Mong MS1 Sport.

Development
Ed Fisher, an avid compiler of Mong Sport history, in 1981  met with designer Ralph Mong. After the completion of the Fisher Skylite, Fisher suggested building an ultralight version of the Mong Sport. A custom built ultralight prototype was built for Fisher, called the Travelight. A second model was constructed, built for pilots up to 6' 2" (188 cm), which became known as the Micro Mong.

Design
The fuselage is welded 4130 steel tubing. The front wing spars are  aluminum tubing, with aluminum ribs and aircraft fabric covering. The wing area of the ultralight version is larger than the heavier Mong Sport it replicates, in order to keep the stall speed low.

Operational history

A Micro Mong floatplane recorded the fastest seaplane takeoff of 2.5 seconds at the Experimental Aircraft Association airshow in 2008.

Variants
Micro Mong 2XF Powered by a HKS 700E 2 cylinder 4-stroke air-cooled engine.
Raceair Lil Bitts Developed at the same time by Fisher using a deeper Micro Mong fuselage to resemble a Pitts Special.

Specifications (Micro Mong)

See also

References

Homebuilt aircraft
Biplanes
Green Sky Adventures aircraft